Johnny's in Town is a World War I song written by Jack Yellen and composed by George W. Meyer & Abe Olman. This song was published in 1919 by Leo. Feist, Inc., in New York, NY. 
The sheet music cover, illustrated by Rosenbaum Studios, depicts a cartoon soldier winking with women in the background.

The sheet music can be found at the Pritzker Military Museum & Library.

References

Bibliography
Parker, Bernard S. World War I Sheet Music 1. Jefferson: McFarland & Company, Inc., 2007. . 
Vogel, Frederick G. World War I Songs: A History and Dictionary of Popular American Patriotic Tunes, with Over 300 Complete Lyrics. Jefferson: McFarland & Company, Inc., 1995. . 

1918 songs
Songs of World War I
Songs written by Jack Yellen
Songs written by George W. Meyer
Songs with music by Abe Olman